Anagabriela Espinoza Marroquín (born April 18, 1988) is a Mexican model and beauty queen who won Miss International 2009 on November 28, 2009, in Chengdu, Sichuan, China.

At the age of nineteen, Anagabriela Espinoza competed against thirty-three other contestants in the 2007 national Nuestra Belleza México contest held in Manzanillo, Colima on October 5, 2007. She obtained Nuestra Belleza Mexico Mundo and the right to compete in the 58th international Miss World pageant held in Johannesburg, South Africa. Espinoza won the Miss World Beach Beauty fast track event and award, which automatically gave her a semifinal spot in the 2008 Miss World competition, held December 13, 2008.

A year later, Anagabriela Espinoza was chosen to represent Mexico in Miss International 2009.

References

External links
 Official Miss International website - Past titleholders

1988 births
Nuestra Belleza México winners
Miss International winners
Miss World 2008 delegates
Beauty pageant contestants from Monterrey
Living people
Mexican beauty pageant winners
Miss International 2009 delegates